Minuscule 135 (in the Gregory-Aland numbering), ε 1000 (Soden), is a Greek minuscule manuscript of the New Testament, on parchment leaves. Palaeographically it has been assigned to the 10th-century. The codex has complex contents. It has marginalia.

Description 

The codex contains the text of the four Gospels on 174 thick parchment leaves (size ). The text is written in one column per page, 25 lines per page.
The first 26 leaves with text of Matthew 1:1-20:12 are paper, they were added in the 15th century. The ink is brown, the great initial letters in black. It was written by an elegant hand.

There is also another division according to the smaller Ammonian Sections (in Mark 241 Sections, last numbered section in 241), but without references to the Eusebian Canons.

Text 

The Greek text of the codex is a representative of the Byzantine text-type. Hermann von Soden classified it as a member of the textual family Kx. Aland placed it in Category V.

According to the Claremont Profile Method it represents textual family Kx in Luke 1, Luke 10, and Luke 20.

The text of the Pericope Adulterae (John 7:53-8:11) is added at the end of John.

History 

C. R. Gregory dated the manuscript to the 10th century. Currently it is dated by the INTF to the 10th-century.

The manuscript was slightly examined by Birch (about 1782), who described it as the first to do so in about 1782. C. R. Gregory saw it in 1886.

It is currently housed at the Vatican Library (Vat. gr. 365), at Rome.

See also 

 List of New Testament minuscules
 Biblical manuscript
 Textual criticism

References

Further reading 

 

Greek New Testament minuscules
10th-century biblical manuscripts
Manuscripts of the Vatican Library